Klisanin or Klišanin is a Croatian toponymic surname for an inhabitant of Klis (municipality in Dalmatia). Notable people with the surname include:
Dana Klisanin, American psychologist, futurist, and game designer
Ivan Klisanin, American record producer
Miroslav Klišanin, Croatian handball player

References

Croatian surnames